The 1884 college football season had no clear-cut champion, with the Official NCAA Division I Football Records Book listing Princeton and Yale as having been selected national champions.

Conference standings

References